The Kentucky Wildcats softball team represents the University of Kentucky in the sport of softball. The Kentucky Wildcats compete in Division I of the National Collegiate Athletics Association (NCAA) and the Southeastern Conference (SEC). The Wildcats play their home games at John Cropp Stadium on the university's Lexington, Kentucky campus, and are currently led by head coach Rachel Lawson. In the history of the Wildcats softball program, the team has made appearances in twelve NCAA Division I Softball Championship, eight Super Regionals, and one Women's College World Series (WCWS).

Head coaches

History
The University of Kentucky softball team had their inaugural season in 1997.

University of Kentucky Athletic Director Mitch Barnhart hired Rachel Lawson in July 2007.  Since her hire, Lawson has guided UK to eight NCAA Super Regionals including an appearance in the 2014 College World Series, the program's first.

In her fourteen seasons at Kentucky, Lawson has an overall win–loss record of 495-297, making her the winningest head coach in school history and already has more wins in SEC play than UK had total as a program when she took over in 2008. UK also finished 2016 in the top 14 of both collegiate softball rankings for the third time in school history with eleven wins over ranked teams.

Another accomplishment since Lawson's hire in 2008 is the construction of John Cropp Stadium.  The facility cost $9.5 million, and debuted for the 2013 season.  UK hosted the 2013 SEC Tournament as well as an NCAA regional, another first for the program. Since 2013, UK has hosted an NCAA regional in 2013, 2014, 2016–2019, and 2021.

Year-by-year results

All-Americans

Other Awards

References

External links
 Official Website

 
Sports clubs established in 1997
1997 establishments in Kentucky